The 2004 All-Ireland Senior Camogie Championship Final was the 73rd All-Ireland Final and the deciding match of the 2004 All-Ireland Senior Camogie Championship, an inter-county camogie tournament for the top teams in Ireland.

This final marked the centenary of the first camogie match, played in 1904. Tipperary won easily, Claire Grogan scoring nine points.

References

All-Ireland Senior Camogie Championship Finals
All-Ireland Senior Camogie Championship Final
All-Ireland Senior Camogie Championship Final
All-Ireland Senior Camogie Championship Final, 2004